Milton Morris (1924–2019) was an Australian politician.

Milton Morris may also refer to:

Milton Morris (American politician)
Milton Morris (music club proprietor) (1911–1983)

See also
Milton Morrison (born 1975), Dominican businessperson and politician